Birthright is a novel by Nigel Robinson from the Virgin New Adventures. The New Adventures were a spin-off from the long-running British science fiction television series Doctor Who. Although part of the main run of New Adventures featuring the Seventh Doctor, the Doctor only appears in the beginning and end of the novel; most of the story involves his companions Bernice Summerfield and Ace. The events in this book occur simultaneously (from the point of view of the characters) to those in the New Adventure Iceberg, which was written by former Doctor Who actor David Banks. A prelude to this novel was published in Doctor Who Magazine #203, penned by the author.

Plot
After the TARDIS malfunctions and then explodes, the Doctor's companions find themselves in two different time zones.  Bernice is stranded in the East End of London of 1909, where a series of grisly murders is occurring blamed on Spring Heeled Jack, while Ace is trapped on the planet Ant'ykhon fighting alongside guerrilla fighters against alien oppressors.

Ace discovers that Ant'ykhon is actually the planet Earth, 22,000 years in the future and devastated by rising temperatures.  The Charrl, an insect-like race, now inhabit Earth.  They have been using an unstable trans-dimensional link called the "Great Divide" to travel to Earth's past in order to escape from the dying planet.  Once there they implant humans with their eggs, but inadvertently kill them, causing the murders blamed on Spring-Heeled Jack.  Since the Great Divide is unstable, any Charrl that travels to the past eventually crumbles into dust.

Back in 1909, Benny is scratched by one of the time-travelling Charrls and is implanted with an egg.  This has the effect of placing her under the control of the Charrl, causing her to replace the missing Time Vector Generator in the TARDIS and reunite it with its other half in the future.  This also stabilizes the Great Divide and allows Jared Khan, a Charrel agent, to attempt to use the Great Divide to give him immortality.  The TARDIS time rams its other half and sends it and Khan back to Siberia 1908, where it explodes, causing the Tunguska event.

In the far future, Ace and Benny are aided by Muldwych, a mysterious hermit and former ally of the Charrl.  He uses the TARDIS to entrap the Charrl inside one its interior dimensions, then sweeps the Great Divide over London, clearing it of Charrl and their eggs (and curing Benny).  But when he tries to use the TARDIS to escape from his exile on Earth, the TARDIS expels him from the ship and returns him to Ant'ykhon.  The Doctor emerges from the interior of the TARDIS, claiming to have been asleep in his room the entire time (but see Iceberg for details).

Production before Adaption
Peter Grimwade wrote the story as a Sixth Doctor adventure story entitled “League of the Tancreds” in mid-1985 for Season 23. It was abandoned due to the show put on a 18-month hiatus.

Continuity
Benny lives with Margaret Waterfield, the sister of Edward Waterfield (The Evil of the Daleks) and the aunt of companion Victoria Waterfield.  Benny also makes use of a bank account set up by the Doctor under the name R.J. Smith, Esq.  Benny is a co-signatory, along with Susan Foreman, Victoria, Sarah Jane Smith, and Melanie Bush.

The Time Vector Generator first appeared in The Wheel in Space.  It also appears in the Virgin Missing Adventures novel Invasion of the Cat-People.

Reception 
In 1994, Science Fiction Chronicles Don D'Ammassa critiqued the novel as "this one's a bit of a mixed bag" but remarked "Unlike many in the series, this one is much closer to the tone of the show."

Audio adaptation

In 1999, Birthright was adapted by Big Finish Productions into an audio drama audio drama starring Lisa Bowerman as Bernice. The plot was changed to fit in with the run of Bernice audio dramas, with alterations to the plot including the use of Time Rings, and Ace's role being replaced by Bernice's ex-husband Jason Kane. Big Finish had no license to do Doctor Who stories at the time and had been adapting later Benny-led New Adventures, before then converting the Doctor Who stories Birthright and Just War in this manner.

The audio drama also features Colin Baker, better known for playing the Sixth Doctor in the Doctor Who television series.

Cast
Bernice Summerfield — Lisa Bowerman
Mikhail Vladamir Popov — Colin Baker
Jason Kane — Stephen Fewell
John Lafayette — Barnaby Edwards
Jared Khan — John Wadmore
Queen Ch'tizz — Jane Shakespeare
Chf. Insp. Prior — Jonathan Reason (aka Jonty Reason) 
Charlie — Benjamin Roddy

References

External links
Birthright Prelude
 The Cloister Library - Birthright

1993 British novels
1993 science fiction novels
Virgin New Adventures
Bernice Summerfield audio plays
Novels by Nigel Robinson
Seventh Doctor novels
Fiction set in 1909